Cannon is an American detective television series produced by Quinn Martin that aired from 1971 to 1976 on CBS. William Conrad played the title character, private detective Frank Cannon. The series was the first Quinn Martin production to run on a network other than ABC.

In total, there were 122 episodes, plus the series' two-hour pilot and a "revival" television film, The Return of Frank Cannon (1980).

Synopsis
Cannon was portrayed in the series as a veteran of the Korean War and a former member of the Los Angeles Police Department. He was not only street smart but also appeared to have an unusually high level of education outside the law enforcement field. Besides his familiarity with several languages, he showed extensive knowledge of such diverse subjects as science, art, and history. Cannon was a widower, having lost his wife and son in a bomb attack while he was on the police force, as revealed in the two-hour pilot.

Conrad was an overweight actor, and the series, especially in its early episodes, made frequent mention of Cannon's weight. Other characters would often remark critically about it, while he himself would joke self-deprecatingly about his girth and great love of food. In fact, Cannon was a gourmet cook who enjoyed preparing food for his friends. Despite his large size, he was a man of action. While he preferred to use his wits to escape a difficult situation, he could engage successfully in fistfights and shoot-outs with bad guys.

The plots, as in other detective series, revolved around Cannon solving crimes for a variety of clients. In a number of early episodes, he was hired by insurance companies to investigate losses. Other episodes involved him working for former police colleagues or other people from his past. In some cases, he was forced into action to clear himself of falsified charges. Many episode plot lines involved Cannon traveling and having to deal with various and sundry incompetent and/or corrupt law enforcement agencies and officials.

Throughout the series' run, Cannon drove Lincoln Continentals. In the pilot movie, he drove a 1970 model year 53A four-door hardtop sedan, which later crashed. In the series, he switched to the two-door personal luxury cars, driving a new model year every season - in Season 1, he drove a 1971 Mark III, before switching to Mark IVs for later seasons. In the 1980 TV movie, however, he instead drove a 1978 Cadillac Coupe de Ville.

Cast

Series star William Conrad was the only main cast member. Conrad was nominated for an Emmy Award in both 1973 and 1974 (Best Lead Actor in a Drama Series), but Richard Thomas won for The Waltons in 1973 and Telly Savalas won for Kojak in 1974.

Other than the title role, the series had very few recurring characters. In the first season, Martin Sheen appeared twice as ex-policeman Jerry Warton, but the character did not extend beyond the first year. In fact, Sheen guest-starred in the third season as a completely different character: a lawyer who murdered Cannon's client. The only other actors to appear in multiple episodes as the same character were Charles Bateman (five episodes as Lieutenant Paul Tarcher) and Arthur Adams (three episodes as Officer Bill Murray).

Guest stars
Notable guest stars included Anne Baxter, Johnny Cash, Cathy Lee Crosby, Joan Fontaine, Mark Hamill, Sondra Locke, Leslie Nielsen, Nick Nolte, Susan Oliver, Stefanie Powers, Denver Pyle, Roy Scheider, and Martin Sheen.

Production
Cannon debuted as a two-hour movie on March 26, 1971 that served as the pilot. In the movie, Cannon returns from an extensive overseas assignment and investigates the murder of a close friend. A later episode would reveal that his wife and child were killed by a car bomb meant for him, prompting him to resign from the Los Angeles police force and become a private detective. The pilot was picked up as a regular series for the 1971–72 television season, and the first one-hour episode aired September 14, 1971. The first season aired on Tuesday nights at 9:30 PM Eastern, following the popular Hawaii Five-0.

The series moved to 10:00 PM Wednesday nights in season 2, then moved up to 9:00 PM Wednesdays for season 3, where it remained for the rest of the series run. Following three consecutive seasons in the Top 20 Nielsen ratings, plot violence and controversial themes increased in season 5 and Cannon fell to 39th and was cancelled.

Props
In an era before cell phone use, Cannon was frequently shown using a "mobile phone" in his signature Lincoln Continental, which was very rare at the time. Cannon would first ask the mobile operator to dial a call for him. Phones of this type were precursors to modern cell phones. The phone prop itself was a Motorola brand MTS mobile phone.

Episodes

Series overview

Connections to Barnaby Jones
Frank Cannon met Barnaby Jones (Buddy Ebsen), an aging veteran private investigator who had retired and turned over his agency to his son, Hal, when Hal is killed. With the aid of Cannon and Hal's widow, Betty Jones (Lee Meriwether), he hunts down Hal's killer. Afterwards, Jones decides to come out of retirement. The premiere episode of Barnaby Jones, "Requiem for a Son" was planned as a second-season Cannon episode, but when Barnaby Jones was sold as a separate series the script was reworked into the premiere of that series. William Conrad appeared as a special guest star.

Cannon had a second "crossover" with the Barnaby Jones series. The first part of the two-part episode, "The Deadly Conspiracy", was aired as the second episode of the fifth season of Cannon on September 17, 1975; the second part aired two nights later as the fourth-season premiere of Barnaby Jones.

Home media
CBS DVD (distributed by Paramount) has released the first two seasons of Cannon on DVD in Region 1. Season 3 was released on January 10, 2013, via Amazon.com's CreateSpace program. This is a manufacture-on-demand (MOD) release, available exclusively through Amazon.com.

On May 4, 2015, it was announced that Visual Entertainment had acquired the rights to the series in Region 1. They subsequently released Cannon - The Complete Collection on September 2, 2015.

On March 18, 2016, VEI re-released the first season on DVD and on April 1, 2016, they re-released the second season.

In Region 4, Shock Entertainment has released the first two seasons on DVD in Australia.

Awards and nominations 
Cannon received three Emmy Award nominations, for Outstanding Drama Series in 1973 and for William Conrad as Lead Actor in a Drama Series in 1973 and 1974.

The Hollywood Foreign Press Association nominated Cannon for three Golden Globe Awards, for Best Television Series - Drama in 1974 and for William Conrad in 1972 and 1973 as Best Actor in a Drama Television Series.

In other media

Novels 
A series of nine tie-in novels were published in the 1970s by Lancer/Magnum in the United States and Triphammer/Corgi in the United Kingdom.

 Murder by Gemini by Richard Gallagher
 The Stewardess Strangler by Richard Gallagher
 The Golden Bullet by Paul Denver (pseudonym of Douglas Enefer)
 The Deadly Chance by Paul Denver
 I've Got You Covered by Paul Denver
 The Falling Blonde by Paul Denver
 It's Lonely on the Sidewalk by Paul Denver
 Farewell, Little Sister by Douglas Enefer
 Shoot-Out! by Douglas Enefer

UK Parody
In an episode of his Thames Television series, British comedian Benny Hill parodied 1970s American detective series. In the skit, Hill played several staple characters of the genre: Frank Cannon, Robert Ironside, Theo Kojak, Sam McCloud (ironically, all but the latter were airing on BBC1 at the time rather than on Hill's home of ITV) and, although he was not a part of the genre, Agatha Christie's Belgian detective, Hercule Poirot.

See also

Notes

References

Bibliography

External links
 

CBS original programming
1970s American crime television series
1970s American mystery television series
Television series by CBS Studios
1971 American television series debuts
1976 American television series endings
Television shows set in Los Angeles
English-language television shows
American detective television series